Ivan Ruben (12 August 1917 – 2 February 1986) was a Danish fencer. He competed at the 1948 and 1952 Summer Olympics held in London and Helsinki respectively.

References

1917 births
1986 deaths
Danish male fencers
Olympic fencers of Denmark
Fencers at the 1948 Summer Olympics
Fencers at the 1952 Summer Olympics
Sportspeople from Copenhagen